Railroads of Hawaii may refer to:
Railroads of Hawaii, Inc. doing business as Lahaina, Kaanapali and Pacific Railroad
List of Hawaii railroads